The list of Chinese cultural relics forbidden to be exhibited abroad (Chinese: 禁止出境展览文物; pinyin: Jìnzhǐ Chūjìng Zhǎnlǎn Wénwù) comprises a list of antiquities and archaeological artifacts held by various museums and other institutions in the People's Republic of China, which the Chinese government has officially prohibited, since 2003, from being taken abroad for exhibition. Many of the relics on the list symbolize the breakthrough of archaeological discoveries that were made in China since the mid-20th century, when archaeology as a modern science began to take root in China.  These items are among the most important excavated treasures in China, and have a particular historical, cultural or artistic significance.

In June 2012, the State Administration of Cultural Heritage announced the second batch of 37 cultural relics forbidden to be exhibited abroad, covering paintings and works of calligraphy. In August 2013, a third batch of 94 items were announced, most of which are treasures excavated at archaeological sites.

Government regulations prohibiting exhibition abroad
According to Article 49 of the Regulations for the Implementation of the Law of the People's Republic of China on Protection of Cultural Relics (State Council Decree No. 377) promulgated on 18 May 2003:

The only existing or fragile relics among the grade-one relics are prohibited from being taken out of the country for exhibition.  The catalogue of cultural relics prohibited from being taken out of the country for exhibition shall be made public on a regular basis by the competent cultural relics administrative department of the State Council.

A first list of sixty-four cultural relics that are forbidden to be exhibited abroad was published by the State Administration of Cultural Heritage on 19 January 2002 (a year before the above regulation was enacted).

In addition to the list of items explicitly prohibited from being exhibited abroad, cultural relics that fall within one of the following five categories are also prohibited from being exhibited outside of China:
 ancient human remains
 the main object of reverence at a place of religious observation
 first-grade cultural relics that are unique and easily damaged
 objects listed in the catalogue of cultural relics that are prohibited from being exhibited abroad
 cultural relics that are not suitable to be exhibited abroad because of their state of preservation

Furthermore, cultural relics may not be sent abroad for exhibition if they have not previously been officially exhibited within China.

First batch of items prohibited from being exhibited abroad
In 2002, the State Administration of Cultural Heritage announced its first list of 64 first-grade cultural relics that are forbidden to be taken out of mainland China for exhibition.

Footnotes

Chinese cultural relics forbidden to be exhibited abroad
Relics
Archaeological artifacts of China
Chinese art
Relics